Jhagrakhand is a town and a nagar panchayat in manendragarh district in the Indian state of Chhattisgarh.

Demographics
 India census, Jhagrakhand had a population of 7507. Males constitute 52% of the population and females 48%. Jhagrakhand has an average literacy rate of 63%, higher than the national average of 59.5%: male literacy is 72%, and female literacy is 54%. In Jhagrakhand, 13% of the population is under 6 years of age.

References

Cities and towns in Koriya district